The following is a list of notable deaths in April 1993.

Entries for each day are listed alphabetically by surname. A typical entry lists information in the following sequence:
 Name, age, country of citizenship at birth, subsequent country of citizenship (if applicable), reason for notability, cause of death (if known), and reference.

April 1993

1
Infante Juan, Count of Barcelona, 79, Spanish royal, laryngeal cancer.
Kristian Bjørn, 73, Norwegian cross-country skier and Olympian.
Andrée Brunin, 56, French author.
Howard Scott Gentry, 89, American botanist.
Kevin Gilbert, 59, Aboriginal Australian writer, activist, and visual artist.
Jerry Hausner, 83, American radio and television actor.
Alan Kulwicki, 38, American racing driver, plane crash.
Fred Schwengel, 86, American politician.
Czesław Suszczyk, 71, Polish football player.
Nicanor Zabaleta Zala, 86, Spanish harpist.
Solly Zuckerman, Baron Zuckerman, 88, British public servant and zoologist, thrombosis.

2
Edward Edinborough Chamberlain, 86, New Zealand plant pathologist.
Hugh Fernando, 76, Sri Lankan politician.
Thales Monteiro, 68, Brazilian basketball player and Olympian.
Masaichi Niimi, 106, Japanese naval admiral during World War II.
Alexander Bell Patterson, 81, Canadian politician, MP (1953–1958, 1962–1968, 1972–1984).
Asoka Ponnamperuma, 56, Sri Lankan actor, singer, and scriptwriter.
Donald W. Reynolds, 86, American businessman and philanthropist.
Sarban, 62, Afghan singer.
Frank Sharp, 87, American land developer and stock fraudster.
Ernst von Bodelschwingh, 86, German politician and member of the Bundestag.

3
Red Allen, 63, American bluegrass singer and guitarist.
Lydia Auster, 80, Estonian composer.
Eduardo Caballero Calderón, 83, Colombian writer.
Eugene Church, 55, American R&B singer and songwriter, cancer.
Sali Herman, 95, Swiss-Australian artist.
Pinky Lee, 85, American comedian and children's entertainer.
Eugenie Leontovich, 93-100, Russian-American actress (The Rains of Ranchipur, Homicidal, Naked City), cardiac arrest and pneumonia.
Alexandre Mnouchkine, 85, Russian-French film producer.
Leopoldo Nachbin, 71, Brazilian mathematician.
Lazkao Txiki, 66, Basque bertsolari poet and musician.

4
Alfred Mosher Butts, 93, American architect, inventor of Scrabble.
Edera Cordiale, 73, Italian Olympic discus thrower (1948).
Pierre de Cossé-Brissac, 93, French memoirist.
Charles Elworthy, Baron Elworthy, 82, British Royal Air Force marshal.
Terje Rollem, 77, Norwegian resistance officer during World War II.
Albert Fahmy Tadros, 78, Egyptian basketball player and Olympian.

5
Harbans Bhalla, 62, Indian poet.
Divya Bharti, 19, Indian actress (Deewana, Shola Aur Shabnam, Vishwatma), fall.
Joe Coscarart, 83, American baseball player.
Vernon McCain, 84, American football and basketball coach.

6
Selma Andersson, 98, Swedish Olympic diver (1912, 1920).
Viktor Avbelj, 79, Slovenian politician.
Charles Burkill, 93, English mathematician.
Peter DeFeo, 91, American mobster belonging to the Genovese crime family.
Cecil B. Lyon, 89, American diplomat.
Frans Slaats, 80, Dutch cyclist.
Inge von Wangenheim, 80, German actress and author.
Chen Zaidao, 84, Chinese general.

7
Edward Adamczyk, 71, Polish athlete and Olympian.
Tonny Ahm, 78, Danish badminton champion.
Bob Alexander, 70, Canadian baseball player.
Gerardo Chiaromonte, 68, Italian communist politician, journalist, and writer.
Max Croiset, 80, Dutch actor (The Village on the River).
Billy Griffith, 78, English cricketer.
Heinz Hoppe, 69, German lyric tenor in opera, lied and operetta.
Gladys Lehman, 101, American screenwriter, pneumonia.
Vincent Perera, 74, Sri Lankan statesman.
Terry Price, 47, Welsh rugby player, traffic collision.
Hugh E. Rodham, 82, American businessman and father of politician Hillary Clinton, stroke.
Arleen Whelan, 76, American actress (The Doughgirls), stroke.

8
Marian Anderson, 96, American singer, congestive heart failure.
Stole Aranđelović, 62, Serbian actor.
Álida España, 68, Guatemalan activist and politician.
Billy Gayles, 61, American drummer and singer, cancer.
Bobby Mitchell, 68, Scottish football player.
Aleksei Saltykov, 58, Soviet and Russian film director and screenwriter.
Dave Shannon, 70, Australian bomber pilot during World War II.

9
Morteza Avini, 45, Iranian documentary filmmaker and author, landmine explosion.
Robert B. Claytor, 71, American railroad administrator, cancer.
Les Cunningham, 79, Canadian ice hockey player.
Lindalva Justo de Oliveira, 39, Brazilian Roman Catholic nun, stabbed.
Joseph B. Soloveitchik, 90, American Orthodox rabbi and philosopher.
Jess Yates, 74, English television presenter (Stars on Sunday), stroke.

10
Donald Broadbent, 66, English psychologist.
Chris Hani, 50, South African politician, assassinated.
Maxim Lieber, 95, American literary agent.
Leo Metzenbauer, 83, Austrian art director.

11
Wacław Dworzecki, 82, Soviet film and theater actor.
George Albert Hammes, 81, American Roman Catholic prelate, Bishop of Superior (1960–1985).
Rahmon Nabiyev, 62, Tajik politician, president (1991, 1991–1992), infarction.
C. William Johnson, 76, American skeleton racer and Olympian.
Malcolm Wiseman, 79, Canadian Olympic basketball player (1936).

12
Hussein Kulmiye Afrah, 73, Somalian politician and Vice President.
Liz Andrew, 45, Australian politician, MLA (1974–1977), cancer.
Rafael Aguilar Guajardo, 43, Mexican drug lord, shot.
George Frederick Ives, 111, Canadian supercentenarian.

13
Grigori Abrikosov, 60, Soviet theatre and film actor.
Andronik Iosifyan, 87, Soviet aerospace engineers.
Isaac Francisco del Ángel Rojas, 86, Argentine naval admiral and politician, vice president (1955–1958).
Henning Schwarz, 64, American politician, leukemia.
Wallace Stegner, 84, American novelist (Angle of Repose, The Spectator Bird, The Big Rock Candy Mountain), traffic collision.
Ernesto Montagne Sánchez, 76, Peruvian politician.
Rudolf Wetzer, 92, Romanian football player and manager.

14
John Golland, 50, English composer.
Reuben Hecht, 83, Israeli industrialist.
Jim McDonnell, 70, American baseball player.
Roba Negousse, 56, Ethiopian sprinter and Olympian.

15
Harry Alexander, 87, Australian cricketer.
William Bakewell, 84, American actor (All Quiet on the Western Front, Dance, Fools, Dance, Gold Diggers of Broadway), leukemia.
Uwe Beyer, 48, West German hammer thrower.
Leslie Charteris, 85, English author (The Saint).
Lucette Descaves, 87, French pianist and teacher.
Alberto Giolitti, 69, Italian-American comic book artist.
Georges Guillez, 83, French Olympic sprinter (1936).
Herbert Dudley Purves, 84, New Zealand chemist, mathematician, and scientist.
Eduard Rhein, 92, German writer.
Robert Westall, 63, English author and teacher.
John Tuzo Wilson, 84, Canadian geophysicist.
Rafael Ávalos, 66, Mexican football player.

16
Josef Greindl, 80, German opera singer.
Ruby Hammond, 57, Australian indigenous rights campaigner.
Aleksandr Kondratov, 55, Russian linguist, biologist, journalist and poet.
Sutan Mohammad Amin Nasution, 89, Indonesian writer and politician.
Malik Ram, 86, Indian poet and scholar.

17
Joachim Karliczek, 78, Polish Olympic swimmer (1936).
Nikolai Kryukov, 77, Soviet film and theater actor.
Mario Maccaferri, 92, Italian luthier, classical guitarist, and inventor.
Shahen Meghrian, 41, Armenian military commander and political activist, killed in action.
Turgut Özal, 65, Turkish politician, president (since 1989), prime minister (1983–1989), heart attack.

18
Isgender Aznaurov, 36, Azerbaijani military officer, killed in action.
Elisabeth Frink, 62, English sculptor, cancer.
Masahiko Kimura, 75, Japanese judoka, lung cancer.
Walter Lohmann, 81, German cyclist.
Werner Pochath, 53, Austrian film actor, AIDS-related complications.
Bernie Wayne, 74, American composer, heart failure.

19
Steve Douglas, 54, American saxophonist (The Beach Boys, Bob Dylan, Dion DiMucci), heart failure.
Blas Galindo, 83, Mexican composer (Sones de Mariachi).
Tom Jamieson, 69, Canadian ice hockey player.
David Koresh, 33, American cult leader (Branch Davidians), gunshot wound.
George S. Mickelson, 52, American politician, governor of South Dakota (since 1987), plane crash.
Barbara Stoler Miller, 52, American Indologist, cancer.
Clifford Scott, 64, American saxophonist and flautist.
Joseph A. Sellinger, 72, American Catholic priest and Jesuit, pancreatic cancer.

20
Leonas Baltrūnas, 78, Lithuanian basketball player and coach.
Antonio Bello, 58, Italian Catholic prelate, stomach cancer.
Cantinflas, 81, Mexican actor (Around the World in 80 Days, El bolero de Raquel, Pepe), lung cancer.
Evelyne Hall, 83, American hurdler and Olympic medalist.
Frank Stubbs, 83, American Olympic ice hockey player (1936).
Khairallah Talfah, 82, Iraqi Ba'ath Party official and father-in-law of Saddam Hussein.

21
Galeazzo Benti, 69, Italian actor, heart attack.
Paul G. Gassman, 57, American chemist, aortic dissection.
Robert Dale Henderson, 48, American serial killer, execution by electrocution.
Rowland Hilder, 88, English painter and book illustrator.
William Curry Holden, 96, American historian and archaeologist.
Lincoln Hurring, 61, Swimmer from New Zealand, heart attack.
Hal Schumacher, 82, American baseball player (New York Giants), stomach cancer.
Raymond Smillie, 89, Canadian boxer.

22
Luis Beltrán Prieto Figueroa, 91, Venezuelan politician, president of the Senate (1962–1967).
Mark Koenig, 88, American baseball player (New York Yankees, Chicago Cubs, New York Giants), cancer.
Pasang Lhamu Sherpa, 31, Nepalese mountain climber, climbing accident.
Andries Treurnicht, 72, South African politician, complications during heart surgery.

23
Bertus Aafjes, 78, Dutch poet, cancer.
Lalith Athulathmudali, 56, Sri Lankan politician, MP (1977–1991), assassinated.
Robert Bürchler, 77, Swiss sport shooter and Olympic medalist.
Guido Carli, 79, Italian banker, economist and politician.
Cesar Chavez, 66, American labor leader and civil rights activist.
Chaim Mordechai Aizik Hodakov, 91, Russian-American Chabad leader.
Daniel Jones, 80, Welsh composer.
Séra Martin, 86, French middle-distance runner and Olympian.
DJ Subroc, 19, American hip-hop artist, traffic accident.

24
Gustl Bayrhammer, 71, German actor, heart attack.
Richard Donchian, 87, American commodities and futures trader.
Everett F. Drumright, 86, American diplomat.
Ian Jacob, 93, British Army officer.
Ethel Magafan, 76, American painter.
Pierre Naville, 89, French surrealist writer and sociologist.
Oliver Reginald Tambo, 75, South African politician, complications from a stroke.
Tran Duc Thao, 75, Vietnamese philosopher.

25
Geraldo Del Rey, 62, Brazilian actor, lung cancer.
Georges Favre, 87, French composer.
Ferenc Klics, 69, Hungarian athlete and Olympian.
S. M. Koya, 70, Fijian politician and statesman.
Rosita Moreno, 86, Spanish actress (Walls of Gold, Ladies Should Listen, The Scoundrel).
Henri René, 86, American musician.

26
Bob Broadbent, 68, English cricketer (Worcestershire).
Floyd Chalmers, 94, Canadian editor, publisher and philanthropist.
Desmond Crawley, 75, British diplomat.
Darussalam, 72, Indonesian actor.
Roger Miller, 38, American baseball player, acetylene tank explosion.

27
France Bezlaj, 82, Slovenian linguist.
Hans Sahl, 90, German writer.
Ilie Oană, 74, Romanian football player and manager.
Victims of the 1993 Zambia national football team plane crash:
Patrick Banda, 19, Zambian footballer.
David Chabala, 33, Zambian footballer.
Whiteson Changwe, 28, Zambian footballer.
Wisdom Mumba Chansa, 29, Zambian footballer.
Moses Chikwalakwala, 23, Zambian footballer.
Godfrey Chitalu, 45, Zambian footballer and coach.
Alex Chola, 36, Zambian footballer and coach.
Samuel Chomba, 29, Zambian footballer.
Godfrey Kangwa, Zambian footballer.
Derby Makinka, 27, Zambian footballer.
Moses Masuwa, 21, Zambian footballer.
Eston Mulenga, 31, Zambian footballer.
Winter Mumba, Zambian footballer.
Kelvin Mutale, 23, Zambian footballer.
Richard Mwanza, 33, Zambian footballer.
Numba Mwila, 21, Zambian footballer.
Timothy Mwitwa, 24, Zambian footballer.
Kenan Simambe, 18, Zambian footballer.
John Soko, 24, Zambian footballer.
Robert Watiyakeni, 23, Zambian footballer.

28
Jack Bighead, 63, American football player.
Diva Diniz Corrêa, 74, Brazilian marine zoologist.
Harold Darragh, 90, Canadian ice hockey player.
Momčilo Gavrić, 86, Serbian soldier, youngest participant of World War I.
Valentina Grizodubova, 84, Soviet aviator and Hero of the Soviet Union.
Chon Sang-pyong, 63, South Korean writer.
Ben Schwartzwalder, 83, American football player and coach.
Jim Valvano, 47, American college basketball player (Rutgers) and coach (NC State, Iona), adenocarcinoma.

29
Kenneth Caskey, 89, American athlete and Olympian.
Michael Gordon, 83, American film director (Pillow Talk, Cyrano de Bergerac).
Wilhelm Hanle, 92, German experimental physicist.
Cy Howard, 77, American screenwriter (The Smothers Brothers Comedy Hour).
Fernand Prudhomme, 76, French basketball player and Olympian.
Mick Ronson, 46, English guitarist (The Spiders from Mars), liver cancer.
Robert Bertram Serjeant, 78, British scholar, traveller, and Arabists.
Leona E. Tyler, 86, American psychologist.

30
Tommy Caton, 30, English footballer, heart attack.
Mario Evaristos, 84, Argentine football player.
Waruhiu Itote, 71, Kenyan rebel leader during the Mau Mau rebellion, stroke.
Kurt Kuhlmey, 79, German general during World War II.
Árpád Lengyel, 78, Hungarian swimmer and Olympic medalist.
Eric Rowan, 83, South African cricket player.
Dave Waymer, 34, American football player (New Orleans Saints), heart attack.
Daphne Young, 77, English badminton player.
Frija Zoaretz, 85, Israeli politician.

References 

1993-04
 04